is a town located in Nakagami District, Okinawa Prefecture, Japan.

As of October 2016, the town had an estimated population of 13,671 and a density of 910 persons per km². Approximately 85% of the town is controlled by the US Government including Kadena Air Base, the second-largest base in the United States Air Force.

Geography

Kadena faces the East China Sea to the west.

Neighboring municipalities

Kadena borders three other municipalities in Okinawa Prefecture.
Yomitan to the north
Okinawa to the east
Chatan to the south

History

The Kadena area has some of the oldest settlement remains, in the form of shell mounds, on Okinawa Island. The Hija River, the modern border between Yomitan and Kadena, was the focus of these early settlements. A number of ruins of minor gusuku (castles and forts) can be found in the area. Amawari, an infamous warlord, was born in the Kadena area while it was still part of Chatan. Japan annexed the island in 1879, and Chatan became a village in 1908. During the Pacific War, Japan built an airstrip in the Kadena area. During the Battle of Okinawa in 1945, the United States landed on the banks of the Hija River and captured the airstrip. The airstrip became Kadena Air Force Base. On December 4, 1948, the American military government separated Kadena from Chatan and established Kadena village. The United States built Kadena Circle outside the base. On January 1, 1976, four years after Okinawa reverted to Japanese control, Kadena was elevated to town status.

Economy

The economy of Kadena is largely dependent on the presence of Kadena Air Force Base. The town otherwise produces a small amount of pineapples and sugarcane.

Education
Municipal schools include:
 Kadena Junior High School (嘉手納中学校)
 Kadena Elementary School (嘉手納小学校)
 Yara Elementary School (屋良小学校)

The Okinawa Prefectural Board of Education operates .

The DoDEA operates schools on Kadena AFB for dependents of American employees, although several schools are not in Kadena Town.

References

External links

 Kadena official website 

Towns in Okinawa Prefecture